Andrey Nikolaevich Terekhov (3 September 1949) is a Russian IT developer who created the Algol 68 LGU Telecommunication systems.

Education
Terekhov studied Computer Science at Leningrad State University, graduating with Honors. He has a Doctorate in Physical Mathematical Sciences.

Memberships
Terekhov is a member of ACM and the IEEE Computer Society. In 2004 he became Chairman of the Board of Directors of RUSSOFT.

Research positions
In 1971, Terekhov began working at Leningrad State University as a junior research associate.  He was ultimately promoted to head of System-Programming there. In 1984 he was appointed Deputy Director at Zvezda and Krasnaya Zarya.  Seven years later he founded and became Director of Tercom and in 1996 founded and led the Software Engineering Chair of St. Petersburg State University. He also founded Lanit-Intercom Inc, becoming its General Director.

In 2002 Terekhov was behind the organization and guidance of the Scientific Research Institute of Information Technology of St. Petersburg State University.

References

Soviet computer scientists
1949 births
Computing in the Soviet Union
Saint Petersburg State University alumni
Academic staff of Saint Petersburg State University
Living people
Russian businesspeople in information technology
ALGOL 68